Aindhaam Thalaimurai Sidha Vaidhiya Sigamani is a 2014 Indian Tamil-language comedy film written and directed by L. G. Ravichandar. The film features Bharath, making it his 25th project as an actor and Nandita Swetha in the leading roles, while Simon composes the film's music. The film was released on 22 August 2014 received mixed to positive reviews and it was a commercial success at the Box Office.

Plot
The movie starts off with Sigamani as a young student refusing to go to school. His father, after having heated arguments with the school teacher, says his son does not have to go to school. Thus, Sigamani grows up illiterate and uneducated. After 25 years, he has grown up to be a siddha vaithiyar, following his family's roots. There is also a marriage broker in this story, Vijay Sethupathy, who tries hard to find an educated girl for Sigamani, but he is unable to. Due to the fact that Sigamani is uneducated, he is easily cheated by his friends. His only trustable friend is Paalpandi. In desperation to marry an educated girl, Sigamani plans to wait outside a college to find a girl to love. He then sees Nandini and decides to go after her. One day, Sigamani and Paalpandi follow Nandini and end up in her house. After listening to an unknown phone call, Nandini's father Chinnadurai mistakes Sigamani to be a doctor who has studied MBBS and arranges for the marriage, which also takes place successfully and Sigamani is happy as his dream of marrying an educated girl has come true. Before the interval, Ravichandar places another major twist in the story to keep the audience in the edge of their seats.

Cast

Bharath as Aindhaam Thalaimurai Sidha Vaidhiya Sigamani 'aka' Sigamani
Nandita Swetha as Nandini
Karunakaran as Paalpandi
Thambi Ramaiah as Silambu Chinnadurai
Badava Gopi as Sigamani's friend
Imman Annachi as Sivakarthikeyan 
Singampuli as Vijay Sethupathy
Manobala as Soori
Soundararaja as Thiru
Rajendran
Komal Kumar as Bus Passenger
Madhan Bob
Bose Venkat as Trust Manager
M. S. Bhaskar
Renuka as Sigamani's mother
Chaams
P.V. Chandramouli
Junior Balaiah
Crane Manohar
Mayilsamy as Bhai
Dhandapani as Sigamani's father
Pandu
Pattukottai Sivanarayana Moorthy
Kottachi as Sivagami's friend
Sounder
Kili Ramachandran
Bayilvan Ranganathan
Kovai Senthil
Ravi Venkataraman as Police officer
Robert (cameo)
Gaana Bala (cameo)
Yabama JO (cameo)

Production
In December 2013, it was reported that Bharath and Nandita would come together for a comedy film to be directed by new director Ravichandar. The film, funded by Rajam Productions, was told to be a comic tale on the life of an illiterate husband (Bharath) and an educated wife (Nandita). Twenty one comedy actors with Kannada actor Komal Kumar being one of them (in his Tamil debut) were signed for the film, with the director announcing that the film would run along the lines of Kadhalikka Neramillai (1964) and Ullathai Allitha (1996).

The film is set in Salem and 25 days of shoot was completed in Coimbatore, Pollachi, Pazhani and Dindiugal. The satellite rights were sold to Polimer TV

Soundtrack

Film score and soundtrack of Ainthaam Thalaimurai Siddha Vaidhya Sigaamani is composed by Simon of Ainthu Ainthu Ainthu fame. The songs were written by Yugabharathi and the Elarai song written and sung by Gana Bala also featured Yabama JO, a Congo-based singer. The audio was released by veteran director Padmashree K. Balachander himself. The launch of the film's album was held on 2 July 2014.Simon's music, won a lot of positive response and was widely appreciated. A review stated "Simon continues to show promise after Ainthu Ainthu Ainthu!." and "A good different genre catchy album from music director Simon after 555.". The music was also greatly appreciated by veteran Director K. Balachander, as he stated "I myself felt like dancing to those tunes.". The album also featured Music Director Vijay Antony, crooning a complete song for the first time, for a different composer.

Release
The film was later dubbed into Hindi as ATM by Goldmines Telefilms in 2017.

Critical reception
Times of India wrote:"ATSVS is a film so dated that by the interval the reek of staleness is so strong that we start looking at the ticket to see if there was an expiry date mentioned". Behindwoods wrote:"In short ATSVS achieves fairly what it sets out to.  If you are the type who would not take cinema seriously, ATSVS may appeal to you in some ways". Indiaglitz wrote:"ATSVS is nothing but a customary comical movie".

References

External links

2014 comedy films
Indian comedy films
2010s Tamil-language films
2014 films
Films shot in Pollachi
Films shot in Coimbatore
2014 directorial debut films